"Lotus Flower" is a song by the English rock band Radiohead, released on their eighth studio album, The King of Limbs (2011). It features singer Thom Yorke's falsetto over syncopated beats and a synthesiser bassline. Its music video, featuring Yorke's erratic dancing, attracted millions of views and inspired an internet meme.

Though it was not released as a commercial single, "Lotus Flower" entered charts including the UK Singles Chart, the US Alternative Songs chart, and the Billboard Japan Hot 100. It received positive reviews and was nominated for Best Rock Performance, Best Rock Song and Best Music Video at the 54th Annual Grammy Awards.

Recording
Radiohead singer Thom Yorke debuted a solo version of "Lotus Flower" at the Echoplex in Los Angeles on 2 October 2009, while on tour with his band Atoms for Peace. Like the rest of The King of Limbs, "Lotus Flower" was possibly recorded in the house of actress Drew Barrymore. On 24 January 2010, Radiohead suspended recording to perform at the Music Box Theater, Hollywood, to raise funds for Oxfam responding to the 2010 Haiti earthquake; at the show, Yorke performed "Lotus Flower" alone on acoustic guitar. The show was released free online in December 2010 as Radiohead for Haiti.

Composition

According to NME, "Lotus Flower" combines the electronic instrumentation of Radiohead's album Kid A (2000) with the "sonic warmth" of their album In Rainbows (2007). It features Yorke's "Prince-like" falsetto over syncopated beats and a "propulsive" synthesised bassline. Though the main beat is in common time, the handclaps are in quintuple meter, creating a metric dissonance.

"Lotus Flower" has a more traditional song structure than other songs on The King of Limbs; Luke Lewis of the NME said it was "probably the only song on The King of Limbs with an actual chorus". Lewis speculated that the lyrics are about transcendence, self-effacement and "the magic of losing yourself in music and the senses".

Release 
"Lotus Flower" was released on Radiohead's eighth studio album, The King of Limbs (2011). Though it was not released as a commercial single, it entered charts including the UK Singles Chart, the US Alternative Songs chart and the Billboard Japan Hot 100. Remixes of "Lotus Flower" by various artists were released later in 2011 and compiled on the album TKOL RMX 1234567. A performance of "Lotus Flower" was included on the 2012 live video The King of Limbs: Live from the Basement.

Reception
Billboard and The New York Times praised "Lotus Flower" as the best track on The King of Limbs. The A.V. Club described it as "a sensually slinky come-on that's one remix away from being a dance-floor favourite". The Independent said it was "not exactly a singalong anthem" but "just blank and cryptic enough to sustain various interpretations". NME called it "subtle but powerful", and the Austin Chronicle called it "a commanding piece of modern electro-pop". It was nominated for Best Rock Performance and Best Rock Song at the 54th Annual Grammy Awards.

Music video

Radiohead released a music video for "Lotus Flower" on their YouTube channel on February 18, 2011. It was directed by Garth Jennings and choreographed by Wayne McGregor, and features black-and-white footage of Yorke dancing erratically. Yorke said of the video:

By 2013, the video had been viewed over 20 million times. It sparked the "Dancing Thom Yorke" internet meme, whereby people replaced the video's audio or edited the visuals, and led to the hashtag "#thomdance" trending on Twitter. Yorke said about the response: "It's a massive kick. That's what everybody wants. If it's something you've worked at and it goes over the edge like that then that's great."

IndieWire wrote that Jennings had turned Yorke's "spastic" dancing into art that it was "bizarrely compelling ... with Yorke's flailing, curiously spellbinding limbs as the main attraction". Metro praised Yorke's performance, writing that "somehow, even though he seems to be a mass of tangled limbs in the grip of an attack of some sort, it works", but criticised the video set as "sparse to say the least". The video was nominated for Best Music Video at the 54th Annual Grammy Awards.

Track listing

Chart performance

Notes

Radiohead songs
Song recordings produced by Nigel Godrich
Songs written by Thom Yorke
Songs written by Colin Greenwood
Songs written by Jonny Greenwood
Songs written by Philip Selway
Songs written by Ed O'Brien
2011 songs
Internet memes introduced in the 2010s
Electropop songs
Black-and-white music videos
Internet memes introduced in 2011